MALAT 1 (metastasis associated lung adenocarcinoma transcript 1) also known as NEAT2 (noncoding nuclear-enriched abundant transcript 2) is a large, infrequently spliced non-coding RNA, which is highly conserved amongst mammals and highly expressed in the nucleus. MALAT1 was identified in multiple types of physiological processes, such as alternative splicing, nuclear organization, epigenetic modulating of gene expression, and a number of evidences indicate that MALAT1 also closely relate to various pathological processes, ranging from diabetes complications to cancers.  It regulates the expression of metastasis-associated genes.  It also positively regulates cell motility via the transcriptional and/or post-transcriptional regulation of motility-related genes. MALAT1 may play a role in temperature-dependent sex determination in the Red-eared slider turtle (Trachemys scripta).

Expression in alcoholic brains
Transcripts of MALAT1 are significantly increased in the cerebellum of human alcoholics, as well as in similar regions of rat brains after the withdrawal of ethanol vapours. This alcohol-induced upregulation of MALAT1 may be responsible for differential expression of a number of proteins which contribute to ethanol tolerance and dependency in humans.

Prognostic potential in cancer 
The implication of MALAT1 RNA in the pathology of various cancers has been documented. Elevated MALAT1 expression is correlated with poor overall survival in various types of cancer, suggesting that this gene is a prognostic factor for different types of cancer.

As a target for the treatment of cancer 
Genetic loss or systemic knockdown of Malat1 using antisense oligonucleotides (ASO) in the mouse mammary carcinoma model results in slower tumor growth accompanied by significant differentiation into cystic tumors and a reduction in metastasis. At the molecular level, the ASO-Malat1 hybrid stimulates a naturally occurring cellular enzyme that degrades the Malat1 lncRNA. Malat1 knockdown results in alterations in gene expression and changes in splicing patterns of genes involved in differentiation and protumorigenic signaling pathways. Metastatic tumors have a dependency on Malat1—they can't thrive without it. And very importantly, only the cancer cells seem to require it. In so far as MALAT1 has been identified to be involved in tumorigenesis of various types of cancer such as lung cancer, pancreatic cancer, cervical cancer Malat1 ASOs represent a potential therapy for inhibiting such cancers progression.

See also 
 Long non-coding RNA
 MALAT1-associated small cytoplasmic RNA

References

Further reading

External links 
 OMIM page for MALAT1
 HGNC page for MALAT1
 
 Relevance of MALAT1 in single-cell RNA sequencing data

Non-coding RNA